The Sun of Tiphareth is the second full-length studio album by black metal band Absu. It was released on Osmose Productions in 1995.

Track listing
All music by Absu. Lyrics by Proscriptor and Equitant, with additional lyrics by Trent White. Copyright Osmose Productions.

"Apzu" – 11:18
"Feis Mor Tir Na N'Og (Across the North Sea of Visnech)" – 8:05
"Cyntefyn's Fountain" – 3:46
"A Quest Into the 77th Novel" – 5:48
"Our Lust for Lunar Plains (Nox Luna Inlustris)" – 1:49
"The Coming of War" (Trent White) – 5:15
"The Sun of Tiphareth" – 7:06

Personnel
Proscriptor – all percussives, synthesizers, flute and voice
Equitant Ifernain Dal Gais – electric lead guitar and electric bass guitar
Shaftiel (Lord of Shadows) – electric lead guitar, electric bass guitar, acoustic guitar and voice
Lynette Mitchell – additional vocals on "Apzu", "A Quest Into the 77th Novel" and "The Coming of War"

Production
Arranged & produced by Absu
Executive production by Osmose Productions
Engineered by Danny Brown at Goodnight Studios, Dallas, Texas

References

External links
Absu on Myspace

1995 albums
Absu (band) albums